Carex capitata is a species of sedge known by the common name capitate sedge. It has a circumboreal distribution including Norway, Russia, Siberia, Alaska, Canada and Greenland. Growing in wet places in boreal forests and mountain meadows in alpine climates.

Description
This sedge is a loosely or densely clumping plant growing 10 to 35 centimeters tall. The leaves are quill-like, narrow and rolled tightly. The inflorescence is generally not more than a centimeter long and has several male and female flowers. It reproduces by seed and vegetatively by rhizomes.

References

External links
Jepson Manual Treatment - Carex capitata
USDA Plants Profile: Carex capitata
Flora of North America
Forest Service Ecology
Carex capitata - Photo gallery

capitata
Alpine flora
Flora of North America
Flora of Europe
Flora of Asia
Plants described in 1759
Taxa named by Carl Linnaeus
Flora of Greenland